The second season of The Golden Girls premiered on NBC on September 27, 1986, and concluded on May 16, 1987. The season consisted of 26 episodes.

Broadcast history
The season originally aired Saturdays at 9:00-9:30 pm (EST) on NBC from September 27, 1986, to May 16, 1987.

Episodes

Awards and nominations
39th Primetime Emmy Awards
Award for Outstanding Comedy Series
Nomination for Outstanding Lead Actress in a Comedy Series (Beatrice Arthur) (Episode: "The Stan Who Came to Dinner")
Award for Outstanding Lead Actress in a Comedy Series (Rue McClanahan) (Episode: "End of the Curse")
Nomination for Outstanding Lead Actress in a Comedy Series (Betty White) (Episode: "Isn't It Romantic?")
Nomination for Outstanding Supporting Actress in a Comedy Series (Estelle Getty)
Nomination for Outstanding Guest Performer in a Comedy Series (Herb Edelman) (Episode: "The Stan Who Came to Dinner")
Nomination for Outstanding Guest Performer in a Comedy Series (Lois Nettleton) (Episode: "Isn't It Romantic?")
Nomination for Outstanding Guest Performer in a Comedy Series (Nancy Walker) (Episode: "A Long Days Journey Into Marinara")
Award for Outstanding Directing for a Comedy Series (Terry Hughes) (Episode: "Isn't It Romantic?")
Nomination for Outstanding Writing for a Comedy Series (Jeffrey Duteil) (Episode: "Isn't It Romantic?")

44th Golden Globe Awards
Award for Best Comedy Series
Nomination for Best Actress in a Comedy Series (Beatrice Arthur)
Nomination for Best Actress in a Comedy Series (Estelle Getty)
Nomination for Best Actress in a Comedy Series (Rue McClanahan)
Nomination for Best Actress in a Comedy Series (Betty White)

Writers Guild of America Awards
Award for Outstanding Writing for a Comedy Series (Barry Fanaro, Mort Nathan) (Episode: "'Twas the Nightmare Before Christmas")
Nomination for Outstanding Writing for a Comedy Series (Kathy Speer, Terry Grossman, Barry Fanaro, Mort Nathan) (Episode: "A Piece of Cake")

Directors Guild of America Awards
Award for Outstanding Directing for a Comedy Series (Terry Hughes) (Episode: "Isn't It Romantic?")

Home media
The Region 1, 2 and 4 DVDs were respectively released on May 17, August 1 and September 21, 2005.

References

External links

Golden Girls (season 2)
1986 American television seasons
1987 American television seasons